Roland Thill (25 November 1954 – 25 March 2017) was a Luxembourgian footballer who played as a midfielder and made three appearances for the Luxembourg national team.

Career
Thill made his international debut for Luxembourg on 8 December 1974 in a friendly match against Belgium B, which finished as a 1–8 loss in Luxembourg City. He earned three appearances in total for Luxembourg, earning his final cap on 22 April 1975 in a friendly against the Netherlands Olympic team, which finished as a 1–2 loss.

Personal life
Thill died on 25 March 2017 at the age of 62.

Career statistics

International

References

External links
 

1954 births
2017 deaths
Luxembourgian footballers
Luxembourg international footballers
Association football midfielders
FC Progrès Niederkorn players
Luxembourg National Division players